Hypericum hypericoides, commonly called St. Andrew's cross, is a species of flowering plant in the St. John's wort family, Hypericaceae. It is native to the Southeastern United States, Mexico, Central America, and the Caribbean. Its preferred habitat is dry woods on acidic soil. It is a small shrub or shrublet that produces yellow flowers with four petals. There are, according to some classifications, 2 subspecies, hypericoides and multicaule. However, the later of these is usually classified as a separate species, Hypericum stragulatum.

References

hypericoides
Plants described in 1753
Taxa named by Carl Linnaeus
Flora of the Southeastern United States
Flora of Mexico
Flora of Central America
Flora of the Caribbean
Flora without expected TNC conservation status